The Women's 100 metre butterfly competition of the 2020 European Aquatics Championships was held on 17 and 18 May 2021.

Records
Before the competition, the existing world, European and championship records were as follows.

Results

Heats
The heats were started on 17 May at 11:03.

Semifinals
The semifinals were held on 17 May at 18:32.

Semifinal 1

Semifinal 2

Final
The final was held on 18 May at 18:18.

References

External links

Women's 100 metre butterfly